Shawn Dailey (born December 7, 1981) is an American bassist, music manager and producer from Santa Barbara, California.

Television 
Performed on the following:
 Letterman - Rock Kills Kid, Hole
 Leno - Hole
 Craig Ferguson - Rock Kills Kid
 Carson Daly - Rock Kills Kid (2 times)
 The View - Hole, Plain White T’s
 Jules Holland (UK) - Hole
 Jonathan Ross (UK) - Hole
 Jimmy Kimmel - Hole

References

1981 births
Living people
Musicians from California
American rock bass guitarists
American male bass guitarists
Hole (band) members
21st-century American bass guitarists
Feminist musicians